Sardar Muhammad Amjad Farooq Khan Khosa (born 4 September 1950) is a Pakistani politician who has been a member of the National Assembly of Pakistan, since August 2018. Previously he was a member of the National Assembly between 1990 and May 2018 and was a member of the Provincial Assembly of the Punjab from 1985 to 1990 and again from 2008 to 2013.

Early life

He was born on 4 September 1950 in Dera Ghazi Khan. According to PILDAT, he was born on 1 January 1949.

He graduated from Government College University. He first obtained degree  of Bachelor of Arts and then received the degree of Bachelor of Laws in 1971 from the Punjab  University Law College.

Political career

He was elected to the Provincial Assembly of the Punjab from Constituency PP-187 (Dera Ghazi Khan) in 1985 Pakistani general election.

He was re-elected to the Provincial Assembly of the Punjab as a candidate of Islami Jamhoori Ittehad (IJI) from Constituency PP-200 (Dera Ghazi Khan-II) in 1988 Pakistani general election. He received 16,118 votes and defeated Sardar Salahuddin Khan Khosa, a candidate of Pakistan Peoples Party (PPP).

He was elected to the National Assembly of Pakistan as a candidate of IJI from Constituency NA-132 (Dera Ghazi Khan) in 1990 Pakistani general election. He received 78,360 votes and defeated Khwaja Kamal-ud-Din Anwar, a candidate of Pakistan Democratic Alliance (PDA).

He ran for the seat of the National Assembly as a candidate of Pakistan Muslim League (N) (PML-N) from Constituency NA-132 (Dera Ghazi Khan) in 1993 Pakistani general election but was unsuccessful. He received 65,002 votes and lost the seat to Khwaja Kamal-ud-Din Anwar, a candidate of PPP.

He was re-elected to the National Assembly as a candidate of PML-N from Constituency NA-132 (Dera Ghazi Khan) in 1997 Pakistani general election. He received 73,302 votes and defeated Sardar Mansoor Ahmad Khan, an independent candidate.

He ran for the seat of the National Assembly as a candidate of PML-N from Constituency NA-171 (D.G.Khan-I) in 2002 Pakistani general election, but was unsuccessful. He received 49,302 votes and lost the seat to Khawaja Sheraz Mehmood.

He ran for the seat of the National Assembly as an independent candidate from Constituency NA-171 (D.G.Khan-I) in 2008 Pakistani general election, but was unsuccessful. He received 36,400 votes and lost the seat to Khawaja Sheraz Mehmood. In the same election, he was re-elected to the Provincial Assembly of the Punjab as an independent candidate from Constituency PP-242 (Dera Ghazi Khan-III). He received 18,968 votes and defeated Javed Akhtar.

He was re-elected to the National Assembly as a candidate of PML-N from Constituency NA-171 (D.G.Khan-I) in 2013 Pakistani general election. He received 62,849 votes and defeated Khawaja Sheraz Mehmood.

He was re-elected to the National Assembly as an independent candidate from Constituency NA-190 (Dera Ghazi Khan-II) in 2018 Pakistani general election. Following his successful election, he announced to join Pakistan Tehreek-e-Insaf (PTI) in August 2018.

Assassination attempt

In October 2015, seven people were killed after a bomb exploded inside the political office of Khan in Taunsa, DG Khan. Khan was not present in his office at the time of the blast. Tehreek-e-Taliban Pakistan splinter group Jamaat Ul Ahrar claimed the responsibility for the attack.

External Link

More Reading
 List of members of the 15th National Assembly of Pakistan

References

Living people
Baloch politicians
Pakistan Muslim League (N) politicians
Pakistan Tehreek-e-Insaf politicians
Pakistani MNAs 2013–2018
1950 births
Punjab MPAs 1985–1988
Punjab MPAs 1988–1990
Punjab MPAs 2008–2013
Pakistani MNAs 1990–1993
Pakistani MNAs 1997–1999
Pakistani MNAs 2018–2023